The 18th Chess Olympiad, organized by FIDE and comprising an open team tournament, as well as several other events designed to promote the game of chess, took place between October 17 and November 7, 1968, in Lugano, Switzerland.

The Soviet team with six GMs, led by world champion Petrosian, lived up to expectations and won their ninth consecutive gold medals, with Yugoslavia and Bulgaria taking the silver and bronze, respectively.

Results

Preliminaries

A total of 53 teams entered the competition and were divided into seven preliminary groups of seven or eight teams each. The top two from each group advanced to Final A, the teams placed third-fourth to Final B, no. 5-6 to Final C, and the rest to Final D. Preliminary head-to-head results were carried over to the finals, so no teams met more than once. All preliminary groups and finals were played as round-robin tournaments. The results were as follows:

 Group 1: 

 Group 2: 

 Group 3: 

 Group 4: 

 Group 5: 

 Group 6: 

 Group 7:

Final

{| class="wikitable"
|+ Final A
! # !!Country !! Players !! Points !! MP
|-
| style="background:gold;"|1 ||  || Petrosian, Spassky, Korchnoi, Geller, Polugaevsky, Smyslov || 39½ || 
|-
| style="background:silver;"|2 ||  || Gligorić, Ivkov, Matanović, Matulović, Parma, Čirić || 31 || 
|-
| style="background:#cc9966;"|3 ||  || Bobotsov, Tringov, Padevsky, Kolarov, Radulov, Peev || 30 || 
|-
| 4 ||  || Reshevsky, Evans, Benko, R. Byrne, Lombardy, D. Byrne || 29½ || 
|-
| 5 ||  || Unzicker, Schmid, Darga, Pfleger, Hübner, Hecht || 29 || 
|-
| 6 ||  || Portisch, Szabó, Bilek, Lengyel, Barcza, Csom || 27½ || 
|-
| 7 ||  || Najdorf, Panno, Sanguineti, Rossetto, Rubinetti, García || 26 || 15
|-
| 8 ||  || Gheorghiu, Ciocâltea, Ghițescu, Drimer, Soós, Ungureanu || 26 || 14
|-
| 9 ||  || Hort, Filip, Smejkal, Jansa, Augustin, Janata || 24½ || 12
|-
| 10 ||  || Uhlmann, Pietzsch, Zinn, Malich, Liebert, Hennings || 24½ || 11
|-
| 11 ||  || Kostro, Bednarski, Doda, Schmidt, Adamski, Grąbczewski || 23 || 
|-
| 12 ||  || Larsen, Brinck-Claussen, Hamann, Holm, Petersen, Nørby || 21 || 
|-
| 13 ||  || Yanofsky, Suttles, Macskasy, Allan, Day, Schulman || 19 || 
|-
| 14 ||  || Reyes, Balinas, De Castro, Naranja, Bandal, Rodríguez || 13½ || 
|}

{| class="wikitable"
|+ Final B
! # !! Country !! Players !! Points !! MP
|-
| 15 ||  || Donner, Ree, Langeweg, Bouwmeester, Kuijpers, Prins || 33½ || 
|-
| 16 ||  || Penrose, Kottnauer, Clarke, Keene, Lee, Basman || 33 || 
|-
| 17 ||  || Dückstein, Prameshuber, Stoppel, Janetschek, Kinzel, Niedermayr || 30½ || 
|-
| 18 ||  || Czerniak, Porat, Kraidman, Kagan, Domnitz, Peretz || 30 || 
|-
| 19 ||  || Pomar, Medina, Torán, Visier, Calvo, Palacios de la Prida || 28½ || 
|-
| 20 ||  || Jiménez, García Martínez, Cobo, Rodríguez Gonzáles, Ortega, Carlos Diaz || 27 || 14
|-
| 21 ||  || Keller, Kupper, Blau, Bhend, Walther, Glauser || 27 || 12
|-
| 22 ||  || Jóhannsson, Sigurjónsson, Kristjánsson, Kristinsson, Thorsteinsson, Ásmundsson || 26 || 
|-
| 23 ||  || Westerinen, Ojanen, Havansi, Koskinen, Kajan, Venäläinen || 24½ || 
|-
| 24 ||  || Jansson, Nilsson, Johansson, Broström, Olsson, Sköld || 22½ || 
|-
| 25 ||  || Mecking, German, Câmara, Rocha, Miranda, Pinto Paiva || 21½ || 
|-
| 26 ||  || O'Kelly, Boey, Rooze, Cornelis, Beyen, Dunkelblum || 20½ || 
|-
| 27 ||  || Üitümen, Myagmarsuren, Lhagva, Zorigt, Badamgarav G., Purevzhav || 20 || 
|-
| 28 ||  || Fairhurst, Davie, McAlpine, Levy, Freeman, McKay || 19½ || 
|}

{| class="wikitable"
|+ Final C
! # !! Country !! Players !! Points !! MP
|-
| 29 ||  || Hamilton, Fuller, Koshnitsky, Flatow, Viner, Shaw || 38 || 
|-
| 30 ||  || Johannessen, Hoen, Svedenborg, Zwaig, Wibe, de Lange || 36 || 
|-
| 31 ||  || Giustolisi, Cappello, Zichichi, Primavera, Magrin, Romani || 31½ || 
|-
| 32 ||  || Caro, Villarroel, Budowski, Schorr, Diaz, Robles || 30 || 
|-
| 33 ||  || Süer, İbrahimoğlu, Uzman, Boysan, Bilyap, Külür || 29½ || 
|-
| 34 ||  || Vizantiadis, Siaperas, Trikaliotis, Ornithopoulos, Kokkoris, Rizopoulos || 28½ || 
|-
| 35 ||  || Cordovil, Sardinha, Durão, Santos, Pereira || 27½ || 16
|-
| 36 ||  || Friedgood, Kroon, Heyns, Morschel, Griffiths, Hangelbroek || 27½ || 14
|-
| 37 ||  || Belkadi, Bouaziz, Kchouk, Lagha, Ben Rehouma, Hentati || 26 || 
|-
| 38 ||  || Heidenfeld, Littleton, Reilly, O'Riordan, McCurdy, De Loughrey || 21 || 
|-
| 39 ||  || Feller, Philippe, Wantz, Dietrich, Schammo, Stull || 20½ || 
|-
| 40 ||  || Kaplan, Buitrago, Colón Romero A., Reissmann, Sacarello, Benítez || 19½ || 
|-
| 41 ||  || Bakali, Hadri, Kaderi, Nejjar, Soussi, Benabud || 16 || 
|-
| 42 ||  || Casa, Weiss, Donné, Kostjoerin, Kann, Muziole || 12½ || 
|}

{| class="wikitable"
|+ Final D
! # !! Country !! Players !! Points !! MP
|-
| 43 ||  || Tan, Ann, Seng, Kwee, Seng, On || 32 || 
|-
| 44 ||  || Boutteville, Letzelter, Huguet, Jean, Thiellement, Ferry || 30 || 
|-
| 45 ||  || Silva, Recalde, Prieto, Gonzáles, Cantero, Levy || 27½ || 
|-
| 46 ||  || Castro Aguilar, Winter Gallegos, Delgado, Flores Soto, Araiza, Terrazas || 23½ || 13
|-
| 47 ||  || Myers, Malagón A., Malagón C., Belliard Alonzo, Yabra, Andujar || 23½ || 12
|-
| 48 ||  || Kazanski, Gibbs, Hardt, Hobson, Badilles || 22½ || 
|-
| 49 ||  || Rovira Mas, Van der Laat Ulloa, Wyss, Rojas, Quesada, Batres || 14½ || 
|-
| 50 ||  || Salameh, Bedrossian, Galeb, Rizk, Cabbouche || 13½ || 
|-
| 51 ||  || Constantinou, Kleopas, Avgousti, Lantsias, Cababe || 13 || 
|-
| 52 ||  || Hook, Hoyt, Roebuck, Edwards, Potter, Garrison || 11 || 
|-
| 53 ||  || Jiménez, De la Casa, Corominas, Gómez Abad, Soler, Pantebre Martínez || 9 || 
|}

Final «A» 
 Matches played in semi-finals are italicized.

Final «B» 
 Matches played in semi-finals are italicized.

Final «C» 
 Matches played in semi-finals are italicized.

Final «D» 
 Matches played in semi-finals are italicized.

Individual medals

 Board 1:  Tigran Petrosian 10½ / 12 = 87.5%
 Board 2:  Georgi Tringov 11 / 14 = 78.6%
 Board 3:  Viktor Korchnoi 11 / 13 = 84.6%
 Board 4:  Shimon Kagan 10½ / 13 = 80.8%
 1st reserve:  Glicerio Badilles 11½ / 14 = 82.1%
 2nd reserve:  Vassily Smyslov 11 / 12 = 91.7%

References

18th Chess Olympiad: Lugano 1968 OlimpBase

18
Olympiad 18
Chess Olympiad 18
Olympiad 17
Chess Olympiad 18
International sports competitions hosted by Switzerland